The Liguilla of the 2012 Mexican Primera División Clausura season is a final knockout tournament involving eight teams of the Mexican Primera División. The tournament began on May 2, 2012 with the first matches of the quarterfinals and ended on May 20, 2012 with the second leg of the final. The winners and runners-up of the competition will qualify for the 2012–13 CONCACAF Champions League.

Teams
In a change from previous seasons, the 18 teams in the 2012 Clausura were not divided into three groups of six teams each. Instead, the eight best teams in the general table qualified for the competition.

Bracket
The eight qualified teams play two games against each other on a home-and-away basis. The winner of each match up is determined by aggregate score.

The teams were seeded one to eight in quarterfinals, and will be re-seeded one to four in semifinals, depending on their position in the general table. The higher seeded teams play on their home field during the second leg.

 If the two teams are tied after both legs, the higher seeded team advances.
 Both finalists qualify to the 2012–13 CONCACAF Champions League Group Stage. Note that Santos are already qualified to 2012-13 Champions League as the runners-up of the Apertura, and as they win the Clausura final, they earn the spot given to the Clausura Champion and relinquish the spot for the Apertura Runner-up to Guadalajara, the best record of the 2011 Apertura not already qualified.

Quarterfinals
The first legs of the quarterfinals were played on May 2 and 3. The second legs were played on May 5 and 6.

Kickoffs are given in local time (UTC-5 unless stated otherwise).

First leg

Second leg

Semi-finals
The first legs of the semifinals were played on May 9 and 10. The second legs were played on May 12 and 13.

Kickoffs are given in local time (UTC-5 unless stated otherwise).

First leg

Second leg

Final

The first leg of the final was played on May 17. The second leg was played on May 20.

Kickoffs are given in local time (UTC-5 unless stated otherwise).

First leg

Second leg

References

 

es:Anexo:Liguilla del Torneo Apertura 2011 (México)